Freemansburg is a borough in Northampton County, Pennsylvania. The population of Freemansburg was 2,875 as of the 2020 census. The Lehigh River, a  tributary of the Delaware River, flows through Freemansburg.

Freemansburg is part of the Lehigh Valley metropolitan area, which had a population of 861,899 and was thus the 68th most populous metropolitan area in the U.S. as of the 2020 census.

History
Freemansburg was named for Jacob Freeman.

Geography
Freemansburg is located at  (40.627348, -75.339815).

Transportation

No numbered highways pass through Freemansburg directly. Main thoroughfares traversing the borough include Freemansburg Avenue, Washington Street, Main Street, Market Street and Cambria Street.

Demographics

As of 2010, the population has increased 39.0% from 2000 to 2010, which there were 2,636 people in the borough. The 2010 racial makeup of the borough has dramatically changed as well. In 2010, the borough was 59.7% (Whites), 12.7% (African Americans), 0.3% (Native Americans), 0.8% (Asians), 0.04% (Pacific Islander), and 2.0% from two or more races. Hispanic or Latino of any race were 24% of the population.

There were 687 households, out of which 34.4% had children under the age of 18 living with them, 54.4% were married couples living together, 11.5% had a female householder with no husband present, and 28.2% were non-families. 23.3% of all households were made up of individuals, and 8.4% had someone living alone who was 65 years of age or older. The average household size was 2.64 and the average family size was 3.06.

In the borough, the population was spread out, with 24.8% under the age of 18, 9.5% from 18 to 24, 34.2% from 25 to 44, 19.0% from 45 to 64, and 12.5% who were 65 years of age or older. The median age was 36 years. For every 100 females there were 101.8 males. For every 100 females age 18 and over, there were 98.7 males. The median income for a household in the borough was $44,297, and the median income for a family was $48,333. Males had a median income of $31,994 versus $24,853 for females. The per capita income for the borough was $17,983. About 6.7% of families and 9.4% of the population were below the poverty line, including 11.0% of those under age 18 and 6.9% of those age 65 or over.

Public education
The borough is served by the Bethlehem Area School District.

References

External links

Official borough website

1830 establishments in Pennsylvania
Boroughs in Northampton County, Pennsylvania
Boroughs in Pennsylvania
Populated places established in 1830